The following is a complete list of songs recorded or played live by the German rock band Die Ärzte, as well as Farin Urlaub, the Farin Urlaub Racing Team, and musician Bela B.

Die Ärzte songs

Released songs

Hidden tracks

Intros and speeches

Zusammenfassungen 
Zusammenfassung (Le Frisur): 0:04
Zusammenfassung Extended 1-13 (Mein Baby war beim Frisör): 14:38
Zusammenfassung 1: 1:31
Zusammenfassung 2: 0:50
Zusammenfassung 3: 0:31
Zusammenfassung 4: 1:11
Zusammenfassung 5: 1:19
Zusammenfassung 6: 0:55
Zusammenfassung 7: 1:38
Zusammenfassung 8: 1:02
Zusammenfassung 9: 1:22
Zusammenfassung 10: 0:58
Zusammenfassung 11: 1:13
Zusammenfassung 12: 1:01
Zusammenfassung 13: 1:42

Medleys 
 Medley I (from Live - Nach uns die Sintflut)
 a) "When Will I Be Famous" (The Brothers)
 b) "Tell It to My Heart" (Seth Swirsky, Ernie Gold)
 c) "Whenever You Need..." (Stock, Aitken and Waterman)
 d) "I Should Be So Lucky" (Stock, Aitken and Waterman)
 e) "My Bed Is Too Big" (Dieter Bohlen)
 f) "Born to Love" (Melloni, Turratti, Chieregato and Beecher)
 g) "Kiss" (Prince)
 h) "Zu spät" (Urlaub)
 i) "Blueprint" (K. Franck)
 Medley II (from Die Schönen und das Biest: Elke (live))
 a) "Teenager Liebe" (Urlaub)
 b) "2000 Mädchen" (Urlaub/Felsenheimer, Urlaub)
 c) "Außerirdische" (Urlaub)
 d) "Claudia hat 'nen Schäferhund" (Urlaub)
 e) "Ohne dich" (Urlaub/Urlaub)
 f) "Du willst mich küssen" (Urlaub)
 g) "3-Tage-Bart" (Felsenheimer, Urlaub/Urlaub)
 h) "Roter Minirock" (Runge, Urlaub)
 i) "Grace Kelly" (Urlaub)
 j) "Bonnie & Clyde" (Die Toten Hosen:Breitkopf/Frege)
 k) "Radio brennt" (Urlaub)
 l) "Frank'n'stein" (Felsenheimer)
 m) "Anneliese Schmidt" (Urlaub)
 n) "El Cattivo" (Urlaub)
 o) "Erna P." (Urlaub)
 p) "Die Banane" (Felsenheimer, González/Felsenheimer)
 q) "Westerland" (Urlaub)
 Medley III (from Unplugged - Rock'n'Roll Realschule)
 a) "Ohne dich" (Urlaub/Urlaub)
 b) "Paul" (Urlaub/Urlaub)
 c) "Quark" (Urlaub/Urlaub)
 d) "Schunder-Song" (Urlaub/Urlaub)
 e) "Meine Freunde" (Urlaub/Urlaub)
 f) "Nie wieder Krieg, nie mehr Las Vegas!" (Urlaub/Urlaub)
 g) "Rettet die Wale" (Urlaub/Urlaub)
 h) "Der lustige Astronaut" (Urlaub/Urlaub)
 i) "Las Vegas" (Felsenheimer)

Collaborations

Moskito-songs 
The songs from Gabi & Uwe series, that promoted the youth magazine "Moskito".

1 - by Depp Jones (Bela's band during the hiatus)
2 - by King Køng (Farin's band during the hiatus)
3 - by Farin & Hoffmann (members of King Køng)

Unreleased songs

Farin Urlaub and Farin Urlaub Racing Team songs 
All songs are written by Farin Urlaub.

Bela B. songs 
All songs are written by Bela B.

 
Aerzte, Die